Zhu Yuchen (born February 27, 1979) is a Chinese film actor.

He dated Tang Wei since 1995 and split shortly before both graduated from the Central Academy of Drama in 2002.

Filmography

Television series

Film

References

External links
 Zhu Yuchen's Sina Blog

1979 births
Living people
Male actors from Shanghai
Central Academy of Drama alumni
Chinese male television actors
Chinese male film actors
21st-century Chinese male actors